Pannyan Raveendran (born 22 December 1945) is an Indian 
politician and was the state secretary of Kerala State Committee of Communist Party of India (CPI) from 2012 to 2015. He was a member of the 14th Lok Sabha of India and represented the Thiruvananthapuram constituency.

References

External links

 Members of Fourteenth Lok Sabha - Parliament of India website

Living people
1945 births
India MPs 2004–2009
Communist Party of India politicians from Kerala
Lok Sabha members from Kerala
Politicians from Thiruvananthapuram